Song of the summer is the unofficial designation of the song that is dominant both culturally and commercially between the end of May and the beginning of September in a given year. Although the idea of a song of the summer had been around for years, it became a common term in the 1990s. By the early 2000s, achieving the label of "song of the summer" became a competition urged on by media outlets. In the 21st century, the growing fragmentation of musical sources has made it more difficult for a single song to become overwhelmingly pervasive.

Description 
The common characteristic of a song of the summer is that there is universal awareness: it is a song that people hear everywhere they go. It is a viral phenomenon. The song of the summer can be so ubiquitous that many get sick of hearing it. It is the dominant song between Memorial Day and Labor Day, the song that "defines the season on the charts and in listeners' memories". The determination of the song of summer is achieved by popular consensus, but is often the song that ranks longest at top of the Hot 100 between June and September. The song of the summer is a question open annually to public debate, not an objective description.

In The Washington Post, Chris Richards describes the song of the summer as "that magical megahit capable of changing the nation's psychic temperature". 

In 1995, New York Magazine declared that a true song of the summer had to be released in the summer, be easily turned into a slogan, and be so catchy that people cannot get it out of their heads. 

In The Wall Street Journal, John Jurgensen proposed that the number of covers a song inspires can be an indicator of the song of the summer, pointing out more than 40,000 videos of Daft Punk's "Get Lucky" made by fans.

The song of the summer is generally a high-energy song. Music journalist Greg Kot describes the song of the summer as energetic, catchy songs that "rule their summer", such as 1989's "Lambada" by Kaoma, 1999's "Livin' la Vida Loca" by Ricky Martin, 2002's "The Ketchup Song" by Las Ketchup, and 2012's "Gangnam Style" by Psy.

Variety magazine's designation of song of the summer is based primarily on audio streams between the weekend after the June equinox and Labor Day.

History 
An examination of the history of the song of the summer in Vox notes that a 1910 article in the New York Tribune says "About this time look out for the summer song", in the days when songs were primarily distributed as sheet music, and cites as an example the hit song of the summer of 1923, which was "Yes, We Have No Bananas", selling a million copies in three months. 

In 1979, a Canadian newspaper described "My Sharona" by The Knack as "the runaway song of the summer".  Huge hits, such as "Summer in the City" by the Lovin' Spoonful (1966), had dominated their summers, but public attention to naming a song of the summer began in the 1990s. Music critic Ann Powers introduced a bracket-style competition for song of the summer of 1999 in The New York Times. The bracket-style tournament was later used by MTV's Video Music Awards for its "Song of the Summer" category. 

Billboard started its Songs of the Summer chart in 2010, and published retroactive charts back to 1985. The Billboard Songs of the Summer chart was originally based on sales and radio play; streaming data was added to its calculations in 2012, and YouTube streams in 2013. The first song of the summer on Billboard'''s chart was "California Gurls" by Katy Perry and Snoop Dogg. 

Achieving song of the summer became competitive in 2013 and 2014. Publications began publishing articles in June to label contenders and offer predictions. In 2013, Stephen Colbert satirized the song of the summer competition on The Colbert Report.

 Shared musical experience 

Summer lends itself to a shared musical experience: people are outside more often, exposed to communal music and open-air listening. Before the 21st century, the song of the summer was widely heard throughout common spaces. People would hear the same songs on car radios blasting in traffic, in stores and malls, at clubs and parties. The monoculture of Top 40 radio became fragmented as radio formats expanded and multiple avenues of music streaming became available, leading to wider musical choices but also making it more difficult for a single song to permeate popular culture. Ontario music writer Joel Rubinoff says, "If a song can break through the din and clamour of our fragmented selfie universe to connect on a universal level, we can, for an instant, feel like we're part of something bigger."Time'' magazine noted the difficulty of identifying a song of the summer in 2020, when the Covid-19 pandemic and the isolation social distancing reduced the opportunities of a shared musical experience. It also observed the impact of TikTok on popular music. Fragmented music experiences produce multiple contenders for song of the summer.

See also 
 Summer hit
 MTV Video Music Award for Song of Summer

References

External links 
Every song of the summer from the past 46 years

Summer
Popular music
Popular culture
Musical terminology
Song forms
Recorded music